The 1983 Air Canada Silver Broom, the men's world curling championship, was held from April 11–17, 1983 in the Agridome in Regina, Saskatchewan, Canada.

Teams

Round-robin standings

Results

Draw 1

Draw 2

Draw 3

Draw 4

Draw 5

Draw 6

Draw 7

Draw 8

Draw 9

Tiebreakers

Round 1

Round 2

Playoffs

Semifinal

Final

References

Air Canada
Air Canada Silver Broom, 1983
Curling in Saskatchewan
Sports competitions in Regina, Saskatchewan
World Men's Curling Championship
Air Canada Silver Broom
International curling competitions hosted by Canada
Air Canada Silver Broom